The Cornish Institute of Engineers (CIE) was founded in 1913 by the then Principal of the Camborne School of Mines, J.J. Beringer. Its first President, Josiah Paul, was appointed on 1 March 1913. It is the only institute in Cornwall and maintains a continuous programme of lectures. The origins of the Institute go back to the Camborne Association of Engineers, a small but prestigious body existing in the early years of the 20th century and composed mainly of mechanical engineers. Since 2011, the CIE has been affiliated with the Institute of Materials, Minerals and Mining.

History

On 2 November 1912, a special meeting of the Camborne Association of Engineers was held at the Mining School, Camborne, which led to a decision to enlarge its scope. At a general meeting on 4 January 1913, the then Principal of the Camborne School of Mines, J.J. Berringer, led a discussion on the "Assaying of Tin in Mines". At this meeting sufficient support was achieved and the Cornish Institution of Mining, Mechanical and Metallurgical Engineers, as it was then known, was formed, and met under its first President, Josiah Paul on 1 March 1913.

It was keen to cover the mining, mechanical and metallurgical, in fact all aspects of mining activity, the former three being proportionately represented on the governing body. Initially there were 130 Members including 30 Associates.

The Institute at once assumed a role in monitoring the progress of mining activities in the County, with papers being delivered by persons of standing such as Josiah Paul, J.J. Berringer and William Thomas.

A quote the late F.C. Cann, Manager of Geevor Mine in his Presidential address in 1926 may convey the importance with which the Institute was regarded when he says that "in general we may claim that our endeavours have materially furthered the great modern objectives of spreading the knowledge of mining engineering in all its branches, as well as bringing before the public the actual and potential value of the minerals in the county awaiting development. I make bold to say that our efforts have benefited and hastened the advancement of the mining industry in the county to a much larger extent than is generally supposed, or the Institute is given credit for."

The early work done by the Council and the Secretaries was immense. Transactions were compiled and published.

The outbreak of the Great War in 1914 brought many difficulties, but the institute survived and made important contributions to the Metallurgical Research Scheme administered by the Institution of Mining and Metallurgy (IMM) to further the war effort. A Cornish Tin and Tungsten Research Committee was formed on which a number of the Institute members sat.

The 1914 – 1918 War was followed by a serious depression and the Institute played a supportive role, making generous donations to the Mining Division Unemployment Fund. During this period, a number of tragic events occurred, including the Levant Mine disaster when contributions were made to the Relief Fund.

Later, in the 1920s the Institute played a very active role in resuscitating the mining industry in the Camborne – Redruth area.

It had been the intention for many years to rename the institute the Cornish Institute of Engineers so as to encompass all engineering disciplines and this was finally achieved in 1923. In that year, it organised unaided, the Cornish section of the International Exhibition in London.

More recently, during the Second War, the Cornish Institute of Engineers was again consulted and assisted Government in its plans for maintaining stocks of strategic minerals.

In the post war years the institute was very active in organising symposiums and publishing transactions. These have included for example "Celtic offshore oil and gas exploration symposium and exhibition" in 1973. Another, in 1975, was the Mining and Quarrying Symposium.

The institute has collaborated with the University of Exeter Press in publication of the late J.H. Trounson's book 'Cornwall's Future Mines: areas of Cornwall of mineral potential''.

The CIE has close ties with the Camborne School of Mines (CSM), for since its early years CIE has always been welcomed to use its facilities for meetings.

The Camborne School of Mines site at Trevenson, Pool closed in 2004. Much of CSM has continued with teaching and research at the Combined Universities in Cornwall campus at Tremough near Penryn. Here CSM forms part of the College of Engineering, Mathematics and Physical Sciences of the University of Exeter.

The CIE is currently reviving the close association with CSM, and we retain a healthy level of interest and participation from CSM staff and students. The CIE now holds some of its lectures in the Opie building of Cornwall College at Pool, only a short distance away from the former CSM site, for which we express our gratitude to the Principal. Other lectures, generally those with a greater relevance to mining and minerals, are held at the Tremough Campus, near to the current CSM. The CIE merged during 2011 with the South West Institute of Mining & Metallurgy, retaining the name Cornish Institute of Engineers. This brought affiliation with the Institute of Materials, Minerals & Mining (IMMM, descendant of the IMM).

The early emphasis within the CIE was naturally on mining and its associated operations, but the Institute has always since inception aimed to provide a platform for all aspects of engineering activities. While lectures still feature a considerable range of traditional mining and mineral-related topics, the Institute is keen to explore technological innovation issues, computational techniques, energy source development and usage, and health, safety and environmental management, for example.

To quote from its constitution: 'The Institute shall devote itself to the advancement of all branches of Engineering and the exchange of information and ideas concerning the foregoing by arranging meetings for the presentation of papers and films, and co-ordination with interested bodies of existing and new engineering activities.'

Achievements of the Institute
To this end, some activities have been held jointly with other bodies, including the Institute of Materials, Minerals and Mining, the Minerals Engineering Society, and the Royal Geological Society of Cornwall and further such collaboration may be considered where it matches the aims of the institute.

In the centenary year 2013, the CIE celebrated one hundred years of existence with a one-day conference at the recently developed Heartlands centre in the old Camborne-Redruth mining districts. The title was 'Mining - A Knowledge Cluster in Cornwall', reflecting the roots of the Institute. Around a hundred and fifty people attended to listen to presentations by twelve businesses operating in Cornwall and serving the global mining industry.

One additional function of the CIE is the award of medals and prizes for outstanding achievements. The John Trounson Memorial Prize of £200 to the best student achieving a minimum high standard on the MSc mining course at CSM is one. The West Medal for outstanding papers on mineral processing is another. The Institute is also closely associated with the Cornwall Industrial Trust, started by Hugh Stapleton, which is chaired by the President and which is able to make grants to students.

The Institute's executive consists of: President with Senior and Junior Vice-Presidents, Treasurer and Secretary together with other council members to a total of fifteen. Present membership is over 100 spread over many disciplines. Normally 7 lecture meetings are held each year monthly on Thursday evenings and Autumn industrial visits are made.

It is not a professional institution and there are no qualifying membership requirements except an interest in engineering. However, since affiliation with the Institute of Materials, Minerals and Mining (IMMM) in 2011, it is possible that some aspects may count towards IMMM professional activities subject to confirmation.

1913 establishments in England
Organisations based in Cornwall
Cornish mining organisations
Education in Cornwall
History of Cornwall
Camborne School of Mines